BRP Miguel Malvar (PS-19) is the lead ship of the  of corvettes of the Philippine Navy. In 1966 she was transferred to South Vietnam for service in the Republic of Vietnam Navy as RVNS Ngọc Hồi (HQ-12). She was acquired by the Philippine Navy in April 1976 and later on commissioned as Miguel Malvar after Miguel Malvar y Carpio. Along with other World War II-era ships of the Philippine Navy, Miguel Malvar is one of the oldest active fighting ships in the world today.

History

US Navy
Commissioned in the US Navy as the USS Brattleboro PCER-852 in 1944, she was first assigned in the Atlantic theatre of operations engaged in patrolling and training. On 1 August 1944, PCER-852 stood out of Bermuda bound for Norfolk, Virginia with 26 prisoners of war—sailors from the German submarine , captured in June by a “hunter-killer” group formed around escort carrier .

Relocating to the Pacific theatre of operations, her duties included treatment of wounded sailors and soldiers, and ASW patrols during the invasion of the Philippines at Leyte Gulf and Lingayen Gulf, and in the operations at Okinawa. During her six months in the war zone, her medical staff and crew handled over 1300 dead, critically wounded, and ships' survivors. After the war she was placed under the Atlantic Reserve Fleet but was not decommissioned.

Early in 1946, however, she was converted into an experimental ship to test infrared equipment for the Bureau of Ships. She had her armament removed and her hospital facilities converted to work spaces for test equipment. At that time, she was redesignated E-PCER-852. She completed the conversion in May 1946. In September 1947, the Bureau of Ships shifted the infrared test program to the Naval Underwater Sound Laboratory at New London, Connecticut with E-PCER-852 operating from that base.

For the next 18 years, the ship continued to do experimental work. By the early 1950s the nature of her test work expanded from infrared gear to include optical communications equipment, sonar apparatus, weather gear, and various other items of hardware. In addition to the Bureau of Ships, she did test work for both the Bureau of Ordnance and the Office of Naval Research. On 15 February 1956, the ship was named USS Brattleboro. She continued her experimental duties for nearly a decade after receiving her name. During that time, her zone of operations also expanded to include the coastal waters along the southeastern United States and thence into the West Indies. On 1 October 1965, Brattleboro was ordered to Philadelphia to begin inactivation. Decommissioned at Philadelphia and struck from the Navy list on 1 November 1965.

Republic of Vietnam Navy

She was then transferred to the Republic of Vietnam on 11 July 1966. She served the Republic of Vietnam Navy as Ngọc Hồi (HQ-12) up until her escape to the Philippines in 1975, together with other South Vietnamese Navy ships and their respective crew.

Philippine Navy
After she was cleaned, repaired and made ready for service, she was formally acquired by the Philippine Navy on 5 April 1976, and was commissioned together with other ex-RVN ships on 7 February 1977. She underwent extensive overhaul and refitting of armaments, and was commissioned into the Philippine Navy as RPS Miguel Malvar (PS-19).

She initially served the Philippine Navy as RPS Miguel Malvar (PS-19) until she was renamed to BRP Miguel Malvar effective 23 June 1980. Between 1990 and 1992 the Miguel Malvar underwent major overhaul, weapons and radar systems refit, and upgrade of communications gear. She was assigned with the Patrol Force of the Philippine Fleet, and is considered as one of the most decorated ship of the Navy.

On August 2011, the Miguel Malvar conducted rescue operations on a distressed vessel in the province of Tawi-Tawi. She rescued around 60 passengers from the wooden-hulled vessel M/L Virginia and towed the said ship to a pier in Bongao, Tawi-Tawi.

The Miguel Malvar was one of the participating ships in the Cooperation Afloat Readiness and Training (CARAT) 2012 - Philippines exercises  from 2 July to 10 July 2012.

In July 2018, the BRP Miguel Malvar represented the Philippine Navy in a Trilateral Maritime Patrol (TMP) meeting with the Royal Malaysian Navy ships  and KD Todak at the Eastern Sabah Security Zone (ESSZone) in Sabah.

In September 2018, the crew of the BRP Miguel Malvar rescued and evacuated at least 50 families from a huge fire that broke out near the Pier where the ship was docked in Bongao, Tawi-Tawi. Two teams from the ship was sent to combat the fire until firemen arrived. The fire started at 2:30 am and lasted for three (3) hours, burning down several buildings and houses.

In December 2020, the ship responded to a distress call and rescued 33 People off the Coast of Langahan Island, Tawi-Tawi after their vessel, the M/L Utoh Salon damaged its engine shaft and went adrift for several hours. The BRP Malvar then towed the vessel and bought its occupants back to Tawi-Tawi.

Miguel Malvar was decommissioned alongside her sister ship Magat Salamat on 10 December 2021, in a ceremony at Naval Base Heracleo Alano.

Technical details
There are slight difference between the BRP Miguel Malvar as compared to some of her sister ships in the Philippine Navy, since her original configuration was as a rescue patrol craft escort (PCER), while the others are configured as patrol craft escorts (PCE) and minesweepers (Admirable class).

Armaments
Originally the Miguel Malvar was armed with one 3"/50 caliber dual purpose gun, two single Bofors 40 mm guns, four Oerlikon 20 mm cannons, one Hedgehog depth charge projector, four depth charge projectiles (K-guns) and two depth charge tracks.

During its overhaul and refit between 1990 and 1991, the Philippine Navy removed her old anti-submarine weapons and systems, and made changes in the armament set-up. Some sources claim the loss of its two Bofors 40mm cannons during the 1990-1991 overhaul and refit period,. Final armaments fitted to the ship are one Mk.22 3"/50-caliber gun, two single Bofors 40 mm cannons, three Mk.10 Oerlikon 20 mm cannons, and four M2 Browning 12.7 mm/50 caliber machine guns. This made the ship lighter and ideal for surface patrols, but losing her limited anti-submarine warfare capability.

Electronics
Also during the refit the ship's SPS-21D surface search radar and RCA SPN-18 navigation radar was replaced by a Raytheon AN/SPS-64(V)11 surface search and navigation radar system. Later modifications included the installation of a satellite communications system and GPS system standard to all Philippine Navy ships.

Machinery
The ship is powered by two GM 12-278A diesel engines with a combined rating of around  driving two propellers.

Gallery

See also
 Patrol craft

References

External links
 Philippine Defense Forum
 Philippine Navy @ Hazegray.org
 DLSU ROTC
 Opus224's Unofficial Philippine Defense Page
 NavSource Online: Mine Warfare Vessel Photo Archive

PCE(R)-848-class patrol craft
Ships built in Chicago
1944 ships
Ships transferred from the United States Navy to the Republic of Vietnam Navy
PCE(R)-848-class patrol craft of the Philippine Navy
Miguel Malvar-class corvettes
Corvettes of the Philippines